Carcassonne Cathedral (French: Cathédrale Saint-Michel de Carcassonne) is a cathedral and designated national monument in Carcassonne, France. It is the seat of the Roman Catholic Bishop of Carcassonne and Narbonne.

The building was built in the thirteenth century as a parish church, dedicated to Saint Michael. Following war damage in the fourteenth century it was rebuilt as a fortified church.

In 1803 St. Michael's was elevated to cathedral status, replacing the earlier cathedral dedicated to Saints Nazarius and Celsus, now the Basilica of St. Nazaire and St. Celse.

St. Michael's is used by the Priestly Fraternity of St. Peter.

See also

Basilica of St. Nazaire and St. Celse, Carcassonne
List of Gothic Cathedrals in Europe

References

External links

 Location
  Centre des monuments nationaux: Cathédrale Saint-Michel de Carcassonne

Carcassonne
Roman Catholic cathedrals in France
Fortified church buildings in France
Churches in Aude
Monuments historiques of Aude